Antigastra longipalpis is a moth in the family Crambidae. It was described by Charles Swinhoe in 1894 and is found in India.

References

Spilomelinae
Moths described in 1894
Moths of Asia
Taxa named by Charles Swinhoe